El Mida is a town and commune in the Nabeul Governorate, Tunisia. As of 2004, it had a population of 3,437.

See also
List of cities in Tunisia
El Mida-Nabeul is a town and commune in the Nabeul Governorate, Tunisia. As of 2004 it had a population of 3,437.

References

Populated places in Tunisia
Communes of Tunisia